Hamza Yiğit Akman (born 27 September 2004) is a Turkish professional footballer who plays as a midfielder for Süper Lig club Galatasaray. Akman represented Turkey at youth levels, latest at U18 level, as of August 2022.

Club career
Akman contributed Galatasaray U19 squad with 8 goals and 6 assists at 2020–21 TFF U-19 Süper Lig, the youth development league governed by TFF, in which Galatasaray eventually won. On 8 September 2021, Galatasaray announced professional contract signing with Akman, effective until the end of 2023–24 season. Akman made his Süper Lig debut on 13 August 2022, Saturday, coming from bench on 82nd minute in match week 2 encounter against Giresunspor, in which Galatasaray lost at home 0–1.

Personal life
Hamza Akman is the son of former Turkish international footballer Ayhan Akman. His brother Efe plays at Galatasaray S.K. Football Academy as of 2022. Turkish youth international Ali Akman is his cousin.

Career statistics

Club

Honours
Galatasaray
TFF U19 Süper Lig: 2020–21

References
Citations

External links
 

2004 births
Living people
People from Şişli
Footballers from Istanbul
Turkish footballers
Association football midfielders
Süper Lig players
Galatasaray S.K. footballers